Melilli (Sicilian: Miliddi) is a comune (municipality) in the Province of Syracuse, Sicily (southern Italy), located about  southeast of Palermo and about  northwestern of Syracuse.

Geography

Melilli borders the following municipalities: Augusta, Carlentini, Priolo Gargallo, Syracuse, Sortino.

History
The human presence in the area is attested since the Bronze Age. Its strategic situation between the major cities of Augusta and Syracuse has played a critical role in its growth. In the feudal age, it became a dominion of the Augusta County.

It managed to revive after two devastating quakes in 1542 and 1693. Since 1842 it has been an autonomous city.

Main sights

The Chiesa Madre San Nicolò Vescovo (Mother Church of St Nicolas, Bishop of Myra), dedicated to Saint Nicholas, has a ceiling painted with the Triumph of the Faith by Olivo Sozzi. 

The church of  San Sebastiano, dating from the 18th century, houses various paintings by Sozzi, among which are a Coronation of Saint Sebastian and The Triumph of the Faith, and a marble altarpiece representing the Deposition of St. Bartholomew.

The church of Sant'Antonio Abate has bronze bas-reliefs on the portal by Domenico Girbino.

Nature
The River Marcellino, flowing nearby, offers   naturalistic spots and an old necropolis.
The neighboring salt-mines of Augusta were an important economic resource as far as the end of World War II.

Economy

Culture
Feasts in the town include:
 Carnival
 Christ's nativity representation (during Christmas)
 Holy week
 Feast of Saint Sebastian - 4 May (Patron Saint of the town)

Twin towns
  Middletown, Connecticut, USA

References

External links
 Official website
 www.hicmelis.it/

Cities and towns in Sicily